Hartkirchen is a municipality in the district of Eferding in the Austrian state of Upper Austria.

Geography
Hartkirchen lies in the Hausruckviertel. About 27 percent of the municipality is forest and 60 percent farmland.

References

Cities and towns in Eferding District